Acacia shirleyi, known colloquially as lancewood, is a species of Acacia native to Queensland and the Northern Territory in Australia. The yellow flowers appear from March to July. It grows in dry scrub, open forest or mixed savannah woodland. Indigenous people used the wood as fuel and to make hunting spears. Cattle can eat the foliage as fodder.

Description
The small tree has a single stem which is layered with dead bark and an umbrella shaped habit. When cut or exposed, the bark will emit an odour reminiscent of violets. Veins are only found in the midrib area and are raised on both surfaces of the blade. The foliage has a blue-grey hue overall. 

Following flowering linear woody brown seed pods are formed that are raised over the seeds and constricted between.

Taxonomy
The species was first formally described by the botanist Joseph Maiden in 1920 as part of the work Notes on Acacias, No. IV, with descriptions of new species as published in the Journal and Proceedings of the Royal Society of New South Wales. It was reclassified in 1987 by Leslie Pedley as Racosperma shirleyi, then transferred back to its original genus in 2001.

A. shirleyi is most closely related to Acacia distans and Acacia catenulata  and all have a resemblance to Acacia aneura. It is known to form hybrids with Acacia rhodoxylon in parts of Queensland.

The species name honours John Shirley, an educationist and scientist, who also served on the council of the Royal Society of Queensland for 33 years and was twice President.

Distribution
In Queensland it is found to the north and east from around Toowoomba and eastwards into the Northern Territory to around the Victoria River. It is often part of monsoon forest or dry scrubland but is not a part of rainforest communities. It is also found in low open forests or mixed savannah woodlands and can form dense stands.

Uses and cultivation
The wood is hard and heavy, and is a rich dark brown with pale sapwood. Indigenous people used the wood as fuel and to make hunting spears. The bark contains tannins and can be used as an astringent for treatment of diarrhoea and dysentery when taken internally. It is not suitable for use as fence posts as it tends to rot when in the ground. Lancewood is a hardy tree with potential as a shelter or screening plant. Cattle can eat its leaves for fodder. 

The plant grows well in a sunny position in a well-drained soil and is drought tolerant. It grows in mainly frost-free regions but can tolerate a light frost. It is suitable in areas of shallow and nutrient deficient slightly acid soils. They can produce flowers at an age of 14 months. Seeds need to be pretreated by scarification prior to planting. It has a symbiotic relationship with different types of soil bacteria that can form nodules on the roots and fix atmospheric nitrogen into the soil.

See also
List of Acacia species

References

External links

shirleyi
Fabales of Australia
Flora of Queensland
Plants described in 1920
Flora of the Northern Territory